The vice president of Uganda is the second-highest executive official in the Ugandan government. The vice president is appointed by the president.

Vice presidents of Uganda

References

Works cited

See also
President of Uganda
Prime Minister of Uganda

Uganda
Uganda, Vice President
Government of Uganda
Uganda